The Huron Swamp is a heavily forested wetland located in Springfield Township, in Michigan's Oakland County. It is nine miles (15 kilometers) northwest of the city of Pontiac. It is part of the local Indian Springs Metropark, which is then a component of the Huron-Clinton Metroparks system. Big Lake is to the northwest.

The Huron River originates within the Huron Swamp.

External links
Aerial photo (Google Maps)

Landforms of Oakland County, Michigan
Swamps of Michigan
Wetlands of Michigan
Huron River (Michigan)